Väinö Harry Broman (born 29 December 1932) is a Finnish former sports shooter. He competed in the trap event at the 1960 Summer Olympics.

References

External links
 

1932 births
Living people
Finnish male sport shooters
Olympic shooters of Finland
Shooters at the 1960 Summer Olympics
Sportspeople from Helsinki